Jodie Dobson (born 5 September 1969) is an Australian rower. She competed in the women's coxless four event at the 1992 Summer Olympics.

References

External links
 

1969 births
Living people
Australian female rowers
Olympic rowers of Australia
Rowers at the 1992 Summer Olympics
Place of birth missing (living people)
20th-century Australian women